Jay County Jr. - Sr.High School is a public high school located on the outskirts of Portland, Indiana. It was formed in 1975 as a consolidation of Bryant, Dunkirk, Pennville, Portland, and Redkey Indiana's individual high schools for the respective city. In 2020, the school was built to hold seventh and eight grade students.

Athletics
Jay County Jr. - Sr.High School's sports teams are nicknamed the Patriots.  The Patriots were previous members of the Olympic Conference until 2010, and are currently members of the Allen County Athletic Conference since the 2014-15 school year.

Sports

 American Football
 Archery
 Baseball
 Boys Basketball
 Girls Basketball
 Cheerleading
 Boys Cross County
 Girls Cross County
 Boys Golf
 Girls Golf
 Gymnastics
 Boys Swimming (sport) and Diving
 Girls Swimming (sport) and Diving
 Boys Soccer
 Girls Soccer
 Softball
 Boys Track and Field
 Girls Track and Field
 Boys Tennis
 Girls Tennis
 Volleyball
 Wrestling
 Cheerleading

Other extracurriculars
Academic Competition
 American Sign Language Club
 Art Club
 Best Buddies
 Color Guard
 Drama Club
 FFA
 German Club
 International Thespian Society
 Jay Today
 Marching Band
 National Honor Society
 Patriot Edition, Danza, Treble
 Robotics Club
 Student Council

Notable people 
 Mary Meeker

See also
 List of high schools in Indiana

References

External links
Official Website
Historic Website
Jay County FFA
Jay County Marching Patriots Band and Guard
Jay County Robotics

Public high schools in Indiana
Schools in Jay County, Indiana
1975 establishments in Indiana